Tina Manker  (born 3 March 1989) is a German rower. She was junior world champion in 2006 (junior quad scull), U23 world championship (double scull), and world champion in the women's quad sculls elite class at the 2011 World Championships. She finished her rowing career after participating at the 2012 Summer Olympics in double scull. She trained as a teacher in German and English, first at the Humboldt University of Berlin and then at Victoria University of Wellington in New Zealand. After several years teaching at Onslow College, where she also coached the rowing team, she now works for High Performance Sport New Zealand in Cambridge.

Early life and education
Manker was born in March 1989 in Ludwigsfelde, Brandenburg. At the time, this was East Germany but the German reunification happened the following year. In 2000, she decided to enroll at Flatow-Oberschule, a sport school supported by the German Olympic Sports Confederation and in that year, she took up rowing. In 2008, she went to the Humboldt University of Berlin to become a teacher, majoring in German and English. During 2013, she studied for a graduate diploma in teaching at Victoria University of Wellington, from which she graduated in 2014. From 2018 to 2020, Manker was enrolled at the International Institute of Modern Letters, a centre of creative writing that is part of Victoria University of Wellington. She graduated with a Master of Arts, with her thesis titled New Zealand Young Adult Fiction: National Myths, Identity and Coming-of-age.

Rowing career 
What fascinates Manker about rowing is the constantly changing conditions of wind and water. At the 2006 World Rowing Junior Championships in Amsterdam, she became world champion in the junior quad scull. At the 2007 World Rowing Junior Championships in Beijing, she won silver in the single scull, beaten by the Chinese rower Zhu Weiwei. At the 2008 World Rowing U23 Championships in her native Brandenburg, she took the U23 world championship in the double scull alongside .

At the 2009 World Rowing Championships in Poznań, Poland, she missed the A-final and came second in the B-final in the double scull alongside Dunsing. In 2010, she became German national champion in the double scull alongside Julia Richter, who is also a member of the Ruderklub am Wannsee. At the 2010 European Rowing Championships in Montemor-o-Velho, Portugal, she won silver in the quad scull alongside Britta Oppelt, Carina Bär, and Richter. The same team won bronze at the 2010 World Rowing Championships on Lake Karapiro in New Zealand. At the 2011 World Rowing Championships, Manker, Richter, Stephanie Schiller and Oppelt won the gold medal in the women's quadruple sculls. She competed at the 2012 Summer Olympics in the women's double sculls with Stephanie Schiller where they came third in the B-final. Soon after the Olympic Games finished, she said that she would put her rowing career on hold for some tertiary study at Victoria University of Wellington, but she never revived her rowing career.

Professional career
After obtaining her teaching diploma in 2013, Manker taught English at Onslow College; the secondary school is located in Wellington's suburb of Johnsonville. She was in charge of the school's rowing club. She left Onslow College in 2021 and moved to High Performance Sport New Zealand, based in Cambridge at the rowing high performance centre.

References

External links

 

1989 births
Living people
People from Ludwigsfelde
People from Bezirk Potsdam
German female rowers
Sportspeople from Brandenburg
Rowers at the 2012 Summer Olympics
Olympic rowers of Germany
World Rowing Championships medalists for Germany
European Rowing Championships medalists
20th-century German women
Language teachers
German schoolteachers
Rowing coaches
People from Wellington City
People from Cambridge, New Zealand